George Hendric Houghton (February 1, 1820 – November 17, 1897) was an American Protestant Episcopal clergyman.

Biography 
He was born in Deerfield, Massachusetts and graduated from New York University in 1842 and from the General Theological Seminary in 1845.

In 1848 he organized, and until his death was rector of, the Church of the Transfiguration, better known as the "Little Church around the Corner," in New York City.

The story which explains the origin of this name is that actor George Holland having died, his friends requested one of the cities pastors to conduct the funeral services.  The latter refused but advised them to try the "little church around the corner."

Houghton was distinguished for his activity in benevolent work and his skill in teaching Hebrew. For the latter, he was granted an honorary Doctor of Divinity degree by Columbia College in 1859.

He died at the rectory adjoining the church on November 17, 1897. He was succeeded by his nephew, George Clarke Houghton.

References

External links 
 Documents by Houghton from Project Canterbury
 The Little Church around the Corner

1820 births
1897 deaths
19th-century American Episcopalians
American Episcopal theologians
New York University alumni
People from Deerfield, Massachusetts
Religious leaders from New York City
19th-century American clergy